Lac de Montsalvens is a reservoir in the Canton of Fribourg, Switzerland. It was built on the Jogne river, before the gorges, and below the road to Jaun Pass, between the villages of Broc and Charmey.

The Grand Council of the canton of Fribourg decided construction of the dam on 17/18 May 1918. Designed by Alfred Stucky, the construction was completed by 1920 and in 1921 the reservoir filled for the first time.

Thanks to a forced conduct, electricity is produced at the Electrobroc power plant, located at Broc near the Cailler factory.

See also
List of lakes of Switzerland
List of mountain lakes of Switzerland

References

External links

Reservoirs in Switzerland
Lakes of the canton of Fribourg
RLacdeMontsalvens